Vladimir Mischouk (born 1968 in Saint Petersburg) is a Russian classical pianist, Honoured Artist of Russia.

Career 
The pianist entered in 1975 at the Music School of the Saint Petersburg Conservatory in the class of Valentina Kunde. In 1990 he won the 2nd prize at the Tchaikovsky International Competition, as well as the "Rosina Lhévinne" special prize.

Vladimir Mischouk gives more than 100 concerts annually in Russia, United States, countries of Europe and Asia. Vladimir Mischouk performs with world-known orchestras. Vladimir Mischouk teaches at the St.Petersburg Rimsky-Korsakov Conservatoire and since 2009 is also professor at the International Piano Academy Lake Como. The pianist has recorded more than 10 CDs in Russia and abroad.

References 

 http://www.comopianoacademy.com/courses/Vladimir%20Mischouk/
 http://www.latitude45arts.com/artists/view/vladimir_mischouk

Russian classical pianists
Male classical pianists
1968 births
Living people
Reina Sofía School of Music alumni
21st-century classical pianists
21st-century Russian male musicians